Marc Brys (born 10 May 1962) is a Belgian football manager and former player, who manages OH Leuven in the Belgian First Division A.

Career
His coaching career took off at Belgian club, Berchem Sport, which he guided to the championship of the Belgian fourth and third divisions. After this success, Brys took over the first division club Germinal Beerschot.

In his first year, with the smallest budget of the competition, Germinal finished 7th, although 75% of Belgian coaches predicted that the club would be relegated. In May 2005, during his second year, Brys took Germinal to a 2–1 victory over Club Brugge in the Belgian Cup, the first and only prize Germinal would win in its history. Germinal participated in the 2005–06 UEFA Cup but was eliminated by Olympique de Marseille on penalty kicks.

In 2006–07 Brys coached Royal Mouscron-Péruwelz, where he was fired despite finishing in seventh place. He subsequently coached in Holland at FC Eindhoven and Den Bosch.

In 2010 Brys signed for two years with KV Mechelen. In his first year, the club attained the highest point total in its history.

In 2012 Brys managed Saudi club Al-Faisaly FC (Harmah). He reached the semi finals of the Crown Prince Cup and became group winner of the Gulf Cup. In his second season, however, he was fired, and took over the Club Al-Raed for the last four games of the competition. He managed to keep them in the First League with two wins and two draws.

Managerial statistics

Honours 
Berchem Sport
 Belgian Third Division: 2001–02

Germinal Beerschot
 Belgian Cup: 2004-05

Individual
 Raymond Goethals Award: 2020

References

Living people
1962 births
Belgian footballers
Footballers from Antwerp
Association football defenders
K. Beerschot V.A.C. players
Belgian football managers
Saudi Professional League managers
Beerschot A.C. managers
K.V. Mechelen managers
FC Eindhoven managers
Al-Faisaly FC managers
Al-Raed FC managers
Najran SC managers
Royal Excel Mouscron managers
Sint-Truidense V.V. managers
Oud-Heverlee Leuven managers
K.M.S.K. Deinze managers
Belgian expatriate football managers
Belgian expatriate sportspeople in Saudi Arabia
Expatriate football managers in Saudi Arabia